REC or Rec is a shortening of recording, the process of capturing data onto a storage medium.

REC may also refer to:

Educational institutes
 Regional Engineering College, colleges of engineering and technology education in India
 Rajalakshmi Engineering College, Thandalam, Chennai, India

Organizations
 Railway Executive Committee, in Britain
 REC Limited, an infrastructure finance company in India
 Reformed Episcopal Church, an Anglican church in the United States and Canada
 Regional Economic Communities, in Africa
 Regional electricity companies, the fourteen companies created when the electricity market in the UK was privatised
 Renewable Energy Corporation, a solar power company with headquarters in Norway
 REC Silicon (no)
 Research Ethics Committee, a type of ethics committee
 Rock Eisteddfod Challenge, an Australian abstinence program
 Rural Electrification Corporation

Television, film, and fiction
 Rec (film series), a Spanish horror film series
 Rec (film), the first film in the series
 Rec (manga), a Japanese manga series; also refers to anime based on it

Places
 Reç, a settlement in Albania
 Reč, a town in Montenegro
 Recife/Guararapes–Gilberto Freyre International Airport, of which the IATA code is REC
 Rectory Road railway station, of which the National Rail station code is REC

Other uses
rec.*, a newsgroup hierarchy
Recitation, as abbreviated on course schedules
 Renewable Energy Certificate (United States), tradable environmental commodities
 Rec., the debut extended play by South Korean singer Yuju